Lepidogma rubricalis is a species of snout moth in the genus Lepidogma. It was described by George Hampson in 1906 and is known from Zimbabwe (including the type location Salisbury) and South Africa.

References

Moths described in 1906
Epipaschiinae